Fabrice Luchini (born Robert Luchini; 1 November 1951) is a French stage and film actor. He has appeared in films such as Potiche, The Women on the 6th Floor, and In the House.

For his role in the 2015 film Courted he won the Volpi Cup for Best Actor at the 72nd Venice International Film Festival.

Life and career
Fabrice Luchini was born in Paris, into an Italian immigrant family from Assisi who were greengrocers. He grew up around the neighbourhood of Goutte d'Or in Paris's 18th arrondissement. When he was 13, his mother apprenticed him to a hairdresser in a trendy parlour in Avenue Matignon, where he would take the name of the hairdresser's son, Fabrice, in place of his real name, Robert. His first film role was in Tout peut arriver in 1969. He then appeared in Éric Rohmer's Le Genou de Claire in 1970 playing a small role as an adolescent. He went on to appear in Rohmer's  Perceval le Gallois and Les Nuits de la pleine lune, and also in films directed by Nagisa Oshima, Pierre Zucca, Claude Lelouch, Cedric Klapisch and Édouard Molinaro. In 1990 he appeared in Christian Vincent's La Discrète.

Selected filmography

 Tout peut arriver (1969) – Fabrice
 Le genou de Claire (1970) – Vincent
 Valparaiso, Valparaiso (1971)
 Contes immoraux (1973) – André / Julie's cousin – Story 1
 Vincent mit l'âne dans un pré (et s'en vint dans l'autre) (1975) – Vincent Vergne
 Ne (1975)
 Les écrans déchirés (1976, Short) – Fabrice
 Violette Nozière (1978) – Camus, l'étudiant
 Perceval le Gallois (1978) – Perceval
 Même les mômes ont du vague à l'âme (1980) – Arthur
 La femme de l'aviateur (1981) – Mercillat
 La forêt désenchantée (1981, Short)
 T'es folle ou quoi? (1982) – Jean-François Sevran
 Jimmy Jazz (1982, Short) – Fabrice
 Zig Zag Story (1983) – Bob Hemler
 Il ne faut jurer de rien (1983, Short)
 Lettre de la Sierra Morena (1983)
 Emmanuelle 4 (1984) – Oswaldo
 Les nuits de la pleine lune (1984) – Octave
 Rouge-gorge (1985) – Frédéric
 Profs (1985) – Michel
 Conseil de famille (1986) – The shady lawyer
 Max mon amour (1986) – Nicolas
 Triple sec (1986, Short)
 4 aventures de Reinette et Mirabelle (1987) – Painting Salesman
 Hôtel du paradis (1987) – Arthur
 Les oreilles entre les dents (1987) – Luc Fabri
 Alouette, je te plumerai (1988) – Jacques
 La Couleur du vent (1988) – Serge
 La discrète (1990) – Antoine
 Uranus (1990) – Jourdan
 Le retour de Casanova (1992) – Camille
 Riens du tout (1992) – Lepetit
 L'Arbre, le maire et la médiathèque (1993) – Marc Rossignol – the School Teacher
 Toxic Affair (1993) – The Analyst
 Tout ça... pour ça ! (1993) – Fabrice Lenormand
 Le Colonel Chabert (1994) – Derville
 L'année Juliette (1995) – Camille Prader
 Beaumarchais, l'insolent (1996) – Pierre-Augustin Caron de Beaumarchais
 Hommes, femmes, mode d'emploi (1996) – Fabio Lini
 An Air So Pure (1997) – Magnus
 Le Bossu (1997) – Gonzague
 Rien sur Robert (1999) – Didier Temple
 Pas de scandale (1999) – Grégoire Jeancourt
 Barnie et ses petites contrariétés (2001) – Barnie
 Le coût de la vie (2003) – Brett
 Confidences trop intimes (aka Intimate Strangers) (2004) – William
 La cloche a sonné (2005) – Simon Arcos
 Jean-Philippe (2006) – Fabrice
 Molière (2007) – M. Jourdain
 Paris (2008) – Roland Verneuil
 La fille de Monaco (2008) – Bertrand Beauvois
 Musée haut, musée bas (2008) – Un gardien musée Malraux
 My Father's Guests (2010) – Arnaud Paumelle
 Potiche (2010) – Robert Pujol
 Les femmes du 6ème étage (2010) – Jean-Louis Joubert
 In the House (2012) – Germain Germain
 Asterix and Obelix: God Save Britannia (2012) – Jules César
 Alceste à bicyclette (2013) – Serge Tanneur
 Gemma Bovery (2014) – Martin Joubert
 Un début prometteur (2015) – Francis Vauvel
 L'Hermine (2015) – Michel Racine
 Slack Bay (2016) – André Van Peteghem
 A Man in a Hurry (2018) – Alain Wapler
 L'empereur de Paris (2018) – Fouché
 The Mystery of Henri Pick (2019) – Jean-Michel Rouche
 Joan of Arc (2019) – King of France
 Alice and the Mayor (2019) – Paul Théraneau
 Le meilleur reste à venir (2019) – Arthur

Television
 La chaîne (TV movie by Claude Santelli) – Laurent (1979)
  (TV mini-series) – Bonardin (1980)
 "L'étreinte du diable" (Juan Luis Buñuel)
 "L'échafaud magique" (Claude Chabrol)
 Le beau monde (TV movie by Michel Polac) – Jean-Pierre Davin (1981)
 Série noire (TV series)
 "Adieu la vie" (Maurice Dugowson) – Kowal (1986)
 "La fée carabine" (Yves Boisset) – Pastor (1988)
 Tous en boîte (TV mini-series by Charles Nemès) – Minimax (1986)
 Les dossiers de l'écran (TV series)
 L'argent du mur (TV movie by Jean-François Delassus) – Bernd (1988)
 Au nom du peuple français (Maurice Dugowson) – Robespierre (1988)
 Les nuits révolutionnaires (TV mini-series by Charles Brabant) – Huguenot sans-culotte (1989)
 Six crimes sans assassin (TV movie by Bernard Stora) – Simon Lampias (1990)
 Call My Agent ! (TV Series / 1 Episode) – Himself (2017)

Theatre

En attendant Godot (1978)
Troïlus et Cressida (1979)
De toutes les couleurs (1982)
Voyage au bout de la nuit (1986)
Le Veilleur de nuit (1986)
La Valse du hasard (1986)
Le Secret (1987)
Voyage au bout de la nuit (1987)
Voyage au bout de la nuit (1988)
Une folie électrique (1989)
Deux femmes pour un fantôme and La Baby-sitter (1990)
La Société de chasse (1991)
Partenaires (1993)
« Art » (1994)
Fabrice Luchini dit des textes de Baudelaire, Hugo, La Fontaine, Nietzsche (1996)
Un cœur simple (1996)
L’Arrivée à New-York (2000)
Écoute mon ami (et autres textes de Louis Jouvet) (2002)
Knock ou le triomphe de la médecine (2002)
Fabrice Luchini dit des textes de La Fontaine, Nietzsche, Céline, Baudelaire (2005)
Molly (2005) 
Le Point sur Robert (2006, 2007, 2008, 2009)
Fabrice Luchini lit Philippe Muray (2010, 2011, 2012)
La Fontaine (2011) 
Une heure de tranquillité (2013)

Literature
In 2010, Fabrice Luchini wrote the preface of two books: A la rencontre de Sacha Guitry, published by Editions Oxus, and Seul avec tous by Laurent Terzieff, published by Presses de la Renaissance.
In 2011, he collaborated in a book by Philippe Muray, published by les Cahiers d'histoire de la philosophie (Editions du Cerf). 
Also in 2011, he released Fabrice Luchini lit fragments d'un discours amoureux through Audiolib.
In 2012, he released Variations (La Fontaine & Baudelaire) on CD and DVD on Barclay / Universal Music France

Awards
Prix Jean Gabin (1991)
César Award for Best Supporting Actor, for Tout ça... pour ça ! (1994)
Prix du Brigadier (2002)
Silver George for Best Actor at the 29th Moscow International Film Festival (2007)
Volpi Cup for Best Actor at the 72nd Venice International Film Festival (2015)

References

External links

 

1951 births
Living people
French male film actors
French male stage actors
French people of Italian descent
20th-century French male actors
21st-century French male actors
French male television actors
Best Supporting Actor César Award winners
Volpi Cup for Best Actor winners
People of Umbrian descent